The 2009 FINA Women's Water Polo World League was the 6th edition of the event, organised by the world's governing body in aquatics, the International Swimming Federation (FINA). After playing in groups within the same continent, eight teams qualified to play in a final tournament, called the Super Final in Kirishi, Russia from 9 to 14 June 2009.

Super Final 
 June 9–14, 2009, Kirishi, Russia

Seeding

Knockout stage

5th–8th place bracket 

Championship bracket

Semifinals

Bronze medal match

Gold medal match

Final ranking 

Team Roster
Betsey Armstrong, Heather Petri, Brittany Hayes, Brenda Villa (C), Lauren Wenger, Tanya Gandy, Kelly Rulon, Jessica Steffens, Elsie Windes, Alison Gregorka, Kami Craig, Annika Dries, Jaime Komer, Erika Figge, Lolo Silver. Head coach: Adam Krikorian.

Individual awards

Top Scorer
 — 15 goals

References

World League, women
2009
International water polo competitions hosted by Russia